Capital Hill may refer to:

Capital Hill, Australian Capital Territory, the location of Australia's Parliament
Capital Hill, Saipan (or Capitol Hill), the capital of the Northern Mariana Islands
Capital Hill, Lilongwe, campus of Government Ministries of Malawi in Lilongwe, Malawi
Capital Hill Residence, private home designed by Zaha Hadid and owned by Vladislav Doronin
Capital Hill (album), a 1990 album by jazz saxophonist Buck Hill

See also
 Capitol Hill (disambiguation)
 Capitoline Hill, the original Capitol Hill in Rome, Italy